The Austrian Football Association (ÖFB) is the governing body of football in Austria. It organises the football league, Austrian Bundesliga, the Austrian Cup and the Austria national football team, as well as its female equivalent. It is based in the capital, Vienna.

Since 1905, it has been a FIFA member, and since 1954, a UEFA member. Since 7 April 2002, Friedrich Stickler (Dipl. Eng.), the director of executive committee of the Austrian lottery, has been the president of the Austrian Football Association. Supporting him is its president, Kurt Ehrenberger, Frank Stronach, Dr. Gerhard Kapl, and Dr. Leo Windtner. In 2004, it was announced there are 285,000 players (both sexes) in Austria playing for 2,309 teams in the federation, although many more players play informally or for non-recognised teams. Thus the federation is the largest sporting organisation the country. Football is, perhaps with the exception of skiing, the most popular sport in Austria. Football possesses a large value, and has a rich history and tradition in Austria.

History
In 1894, the First Vienna Football Club, the first football team in Austria, were founded in Vienna. From this nucleus, the Austrian Football Association was established in 1904. One year after the establishment, Austria became a member of the international football federation FIFA and hosted the fifth FIFA congress in 1908. In 1913, they supervised the Galicja national team, which was directly subordinate to the Polish Football Association.

The milestones of the federation and past football history were the years 1930 to 1933, 1950 to 1954 and then 1958 as well as 1978, 1982, 1990 and 1998 with the participation of Austria at the World Cup.

Hugo Meisl was one of the best-known personalities in the early years of the Austrian Football Association, becoming general-secretary and national team coach in 1927. At the 1936 Summer Olympics, his team won silver after losing 2–1 to Italy, Austria's only international final. Meisl's team, nicknamed the Wunderteam, remained unbeaten from 12 April 1931 to 23 October 1932 in 14 successive matches. The highlights of this series were the 6-0 (Berlin) and 5-0 (Vienna) victories against Germany.

The 1950s saw more achievements with their well-known football greats such as Ernst Ocwirk (twice captain of the FIFA World Selection Team), Ernst Happel, Gerhard Hanappi and Walter Zeman. The FIFA World Cup 1954 ranks among being most successful in Austrian Football Association history. Twenty years after being in 4th place in the FIFA World Cup 1934 held in Italy, Austria returned to the circle of the best teams again.

Regional associations
Burgenland Football Association (German: Burgenländischer Fußball-Verband - BFV) in 1923
Lower Austrian Football Association (German: Niederösterreichischer Fußball-Verband - NÖFV) in 1911
Upper Austrian Football Association (German: Oberösterreichischer Fußball-Verband - OFV) in 1919
Salzburg Football Association (German: Salzburger Fußball-Verband - SFV) in 1921
Styria Football Association (German: Steirischer Fußballverband -StFV) in 1923
Tirol Football Association (German: Tiroler Fussballverband - TFV) in 1919
Vorarlberg Football Association (German:Vorarlberger Fussballverband - VFV) in 1920
Vienna Football Association (German: Wiener Fußball-Verband - WFV) in 1923

Former regional associations
 Polish Football Association (ZPPN) in the Kingdom of Galicia and Lodomeria in 1911-1920 centered in Lemberg (today Lviv), transferred to the Polish Football Association centered in Warsaw as the Lwow District (okrug)
 German Alpine Football Association in 1911 centered in Graz
 Austrian Union of Sports Workers and Soldiers

Former associations of Austria-Hungary
 Football Association of German Prague in the city of Prag in 1900 to 1904 and merged to the German Football Union
 Hungarian Football Federation in 1901 as a separate Hungarian association of the Austria-Hungary
 Bohemian Football Union in 1901
 Austrian Football Union in 1904
 Polish Football Union in 1911

Presidents

 1904–1906: Heinrich Strehblow
 1906–1907: Ignaz Abeles
 1907–1914: Adolf Wallner
 1914–1922: Ignaz Abeles
 1922–1926: Karl Volkert
 1926–1938: Richard Eberstaller
 1945–1955: Josef Gerö
 1955–1969: 
 1970–1976: Heinz Gerö
 1976–1982: 
 1982–1984: Herbert Raggautz and Heinz Gerö (interim)
 1984–2002: Josef "Beppo" Mauhart
 2002–2008: Friedrich Stickler
 2008–2009: Kurt Ehrenberger (interim)
 2009–2021: Leo Windtner
 2021–present: Gerhard Milletich

Current sponsorships 
 Uniqa
 Admiral
 Puma
 Magenta
 Tipp3
 Volkswagen
 ORF
 Kronen Zeitung
 Geomix
 Raiffeisen Bank International
 Stiegl
 ÖBB
 Burgenland
 Coca-Cola

External links

Austrian Football Association
 Austria at FIFA site
 Austria at UEFA site

Austria
Football in Austria
Futsal in Austria
Foo
1904 establishments in Austria
Sports organizations established in 1904
Football in Austria-Hungary
Organisations based in Vienna
Sport in Vienna